Simpkin & Marshall was a British bookseller, book wholesaler and book publisher. The firm was founded in 1819 and traded until the 1940s. For many decades the firm was Britain's largest book wholesaler and a respected family-owned company, but it was acquired by the media proprietor Robert Maxwell and went bankrupt in 1954, an event which, according to Lionel Leventhal, "sounded a warning to the book trade about Captain Robert Maxwell's way of doing business".

19th century
In the years just before 1814 Benjamin Crosby and two assistants, William Simpkin (whose daughter married the publisher Henry George Bohn) and Richard Marshall, ran a firm "supplying provincial firms with books and acting as an agent for their publications". Following Crosby's illness with paralysis in 1814, the firm became known as Simpkin and Marshall.

In 1828 the firm changed its name to Simpkin, Marshall & Co. and in 1837 it was based at Stationers' Hall Court, London. The firm became the largest book wholesaler in the United Kingdom.

In 1889 the three firms, Simpkin, Marshall & Co. Hamilton, Adams & Co., and W. Kent & Co., merged to form Simpkin, Marshall, Hamilton, Kent & Co. The firm was, however, still generally referred to by the general public as Simpkin & Marshall. By 1900 the firm enjoyed "almost monopoly status as a book wholesaler".

As a book publisher Simpkin & Marshall was a generalist, with numerous fiction and nonfiction titles. In the second half of the nineteenth century it published many yellowback and paperback books, including the series "The Run and Read Library", the "Bristol Library" and "almost all of the novels" of the popular Victorian novelist Mary E. Braddon.

Acquisition by Robert Maxwell
In the early 1950s Simpkin Marshall, as the firm was then commonly known, was a book wholesaler with debts of $A575,000. Robert Maxwell purchased it for the sum of $A115,000 and it continued to operate as a publishing warehouse company and a wholesale book distribution company within his business empire. He used the company to raise funds, on which it paid interest, but then made generous interest-free loans to his private companies. In four years, he "ran the company into the ground". According to Edward Pearce, Maxwell had used the "high reputation of the old-fashioned family company he had taken over... for purposes of predatory credit". Simpkin, Marshall was declared insolvent in 1954 and its assets and good will were purchased by Hatchards.

Book series
Book series published by Simpkin & Marshall and by Simpkin, Marshall, Hamilton, Kent & Co. included:
 The Abbey Classics
 The Analytical Series of Greek and Latin Classics
 Anglers' Evenings (First Series; etc.)
 Beacon Library
 The Beechwood Books
 Breare Vocal Series
 The Bygone Series
 Clark's College Series of Text-Books
 Crossley's Comprehensive Class Book
 Curtis's Educational Series
 The Devotional Series
 Dr. Cornwell's Educational Series
 Echoes of Exmoor (First Series; etc.)
 Edinburgh Series of Monographs on Art
 Eton School Lists
 Evergreen Library Series
 Farming Essays (First Series; etc.)
 Gill's School Series
 The Gravure Series
 The Guide Series
 Hardwicke's Science-Gossip: An Illustrated Medium of Interchange and Gossip for Studies and Lovers of Nature
 Historic Houses in Bath and Their Associations
 In Tune With Nature
 Irish Texts Society
 Kind Words to All Classes
 The Jane Series
 Jerrold's Jest Book Series
 Kneetime Animal Stories
 Lancashire Worthies
 Library Association Series
 Medieval Studies
 The 101 Series
 Old Friends And New Acquaintances
 Our Country's Series
 Oxberry's New English Drama Series
 Poems of Eliza Cook (First Series; etc.)
 Popular Edition
 Popular Music Series
 Popular School Books Series
 The Quiet Hour Series
 Railroadiana
 The Repertory of Patent Inventions, and other discoveries & improvements in Arts, Manufactures, and Agriculture
 Rosemary Booklets
 The Run and Read Library
 Seventy Sermon Outlets
 Simpkin's Thin-paper Classics
 Simple Records (First Series; etc.)
 Tales of a Grandfather: Being Stories Taken from Scottish History
 Then and Now
 Tourist Rambles in the Northern and Midland Counties
 Towards New Culture
 Walbran's British Angler Salmon, Trout and Grayling: How, When and Where to Catch Them (First Series; etc.)
 Walbran's British Wrangler (First Series; etc.)
 The Waverley Novels
 The Women of The Poets

Series jointly published with other publishers
 Abel Heywood & Sons Series of Illustrated Guide Books (jointly published with Abel Heywood & Sons)
 Alembic Club Reprint (jointly published with William F. Clay)
 Arrowsmith's Bristol Library Series (jointly published with J. W. Arrowsmith and Kent & Co. Limited)
 Arrowsmith's Three & Sixpenny Series (AKA Arrowsmith's 3/6 Series) (jointly published with J. W. Arrowsmith)
 The Botanic Garden (commonly referred to as: Maund's Botanic Garden) (jointly published with Baldwin and Cradock) 
 Chronicles of the Canongate (jointly published with Cadell and Co.)
 Coles' and Tomlin's School (with several other publishers)
 Cook's Traveller's Handbooks (jointly published with Thomas Cook & Son)
 Edinburgh Cabinet Library (jointly published with Oliver & Boyd)
 Oliver and Boyd's "Continuous" Readers series (jointly published with Oliver & Boyd)
 Popular Tales and Romances of the Northern Nations (jointly published with John Henry Bohte, London and J. Anderson, Edinburgh)
 The Vellum-Parchment Shilling Series of Miscellaneous Literature (jointly published with Field and Tuer)
 Welsh Lyrics of the Nineteenth Century (jointly published with Jarvis & Foster)

References

External links
 Simpkin, Marshall and Co, OCLC WorldCat Identities, at WorldCat
 The English Novel, 1830–1836: A Bibliographical Survey of Fiction Published in the British Isles

Book publishing companies of the United Kingdom
British companies established in 1819
British companies disestablished in 1985